In mathematics, additive K-theory means some version of algebraic K-theory in which, according to Spencer Bloch, the general linear group GL has everywhere been replaced by its Lie algebra gl. It is not, therefore, one theory but a way of creating additive or infinitesimal analogues of multiplicative theories.

Formulation

Then the Lie algebra homology

has a natural structure of a Hopf algebra.

The additive K-functors are related to cyclic homology groups by the isomorphism

References 

K-theory